Feet of clay is an idiom used to refer to a weakness or character flaw, especially in people of prominence and power.  It can also be used to refer to larger groups, such as societies, businesses, and empires.  An entity with feet of clay may appear powerful and unstoppable, but they cannot support their splendor, and will easily be knocked over.

The phrase originates from the Book of Daniel in the Bible.  In it, Daniel interprets a dream of King Nebuchadnezzar of Babylon.  In that dream, a magnificent statue is seen with a head of gold, but weaker and less valuable metals beneath, until finally having feet of clay mixed with iron.  Daniel predicts that the glorious statue shall be smashed by a stone into pieces, like chaff on the threshing floor, and blown to the winds.  The image of the expensive statue laid low has resonated as an analogy for seemingly powerful figures with substantial weaknesses.

Origin
The origin of the analogy is in Daniel 2, verses 31–45, where the prophet Daniel interprets the king's dream:

Historical context
The Book of Daniel is generally agreed to be written around 165 BC during the reign of Antiochus IV Epiphanes, who reigned as King of the Seleucid Empire from 175–164 BC.  Under Antiochus IV, fierce persecution of Judaism began in Judea around 168 BCE.  This persecution led both to passive resistance as well as eventually an armed military resistance movement, the Maccabean Revolt.  The author of the Book of Daniel wanted to reassure readers that the end of Antiochus IV's tyranny had been foreseen by the prophet Daniel 400 years ago.  As such, the book includes vaticinium ex eventu, that is, "prophecies" of events that had already happened in the past for the author.  The generally accepted interpretation of the statue dream is that it predicts the history of the Middle East up until the time of writing.  The golden empire is the Babylonians (as is clear from the setting of Daniel); the second empire of silver is the Medes; the bronze empire is the Persian Empire; and the fourth iron empire is the Macedonian empire of Alexander the Great.  The final empire of clay mixed with iron are the diadochi successor states, such as the Seleucid Empire that then ruled Judea.  These successor states had Greek military settlements with an imported Greek elite, but did not in generally over mix with the locals, and were clearly not believed to be as strong as the Greek empire of Alexander's day which was pure iron.  The actual prediction being made, then, is the fate of the fifth empire of the Seleucids: that it will be smashed by a stone "not cut from human hands", that is, by the work of God.

Notable uses 
A well known instance of this phrase is in Byron's poem, "Ode to Napoleon Buonaparte":

Thanks for that lesson—it will teach	
  To after-warriors more	        
Than high Philosophy can preach,	
  And vainly preach'd before.	
That spell upon the minds of men	
Breaks never to unite again,	
  That led them to adore	        
Those Pagod things of sabre sway,	
With fronts of brass, and feet of clay.

In the ABBA song Happy New Year, written by Björn Ulvaeus and Benny Andersson, man is said to have feet of clay:

Oh yes, man is a fool
And he thinks he'll be okay
Dragging on, feet of clay
Never knowing he's astray
Keeps on going anyway In the German philosopher Friedrich Nietzsche's posthumously published autobiography Ecco Homo:

The last thing I should promise would be to "improve" mankind. No new idols are       erected by me; let the old ones learn what feet of clay mean.

In the French philosopher Albert Camus' 1938 lyrical essay The Desert in the collection Nuptials:

In this great temple deserted by the gods, all my idols have feet of clay.

See also

 Achilles' heel
 Hubris
 Ozymandias

References

Idioms